Joe David Coomer (September 11, 1917October 18, 1979) was a professional American football player who played offensive guard and defensive tackle for six seasons for the Pittsburgh Steelers and the Chicago Cardinals.

Biography 
Coomer was born on September 11, 1917, in Greenville, Texas. He went to Austin College. He played professional American football for a total of 62 games.

External links

1917 births
1979 deaths
People from Greenville, Texas
Players of American football from Texas
American football offensive tackles
Pittsburgh Steelers players
Chicago Cardinals players